Guru Bipin Singh (23 August 1918 – 9 January 2000)  was a director, choreographer and teacher of Manipuri dance.

Career
The son of a traditional medical doctor and a singer, Singh began training in his childhood, studying singing and dancing before focusing on Manipuri dance, especially under Guru Amudon Sharma, with the support of Manipur's king. Although he earned a living as a film choreographer, he did not lose focus on his desire to expand knowledge of the traditional dance form. As part of that effort, he created the Govindji Nartanalaya dance school  for women in Imphal and, in 1972, the Manipuri Nartanalaya dance school in Calcutta.

He choreographed many dance-dramas and solo dances and produced many students including Jhaveri Sisters (Darshana Jhaveri), Kalavati Devi, Binodini Devi, Guneswori Devi, Priti Patel, Sruti Bannerjee, Latasana Devi, Laily Basu, Indrani Devi, Manorama Devi, Poushali Chatterjee, Sohini Ray, Bimbavati Devi, Ranjini Basu.

Awards and honors
Title of Hanjaba by the Maharaja of Manipur
Sangeet Natak Akademi Award, 1966
The Sharangadev fellowship by Sur Shringar Samsad
Kalidas Samman by Madhya Pradesh Government
Anamika Kala Sangam award, Kolkata
Shiromoni Purashkar by Asian Paints, Kolkata

References

Further reading

Jhaveri Darshana (1991) "Guru Bipin Singh : achievements and accomplishments", Manipuri Nartanalaya, Bombay.
Singh, Bipin (1982) "Manipuri Dance:Tradition and future" Journal of the Department of Dance. v 1.p 35-38.
Singh,  Bipin (1972 or later) "Manipuri Dance Numbers and Demonstration", Manipuri Nartanalaya.
Singh, Bipin (1990) "Srikrishnarasa- sangita-sangraha:Manipura ke Maharaja Sri Gambhira Simha ke sasanakala" (1825-1834) mem sankalita. Hindi, Kalakatta, Manipuri Nartanalaya.
 
Singh, Bipin (1983-1990) "Vaishnavasangitasastra", Naraharichakrabartti, Bipin Singh, Gajanana Ranade, Mandala Vyasa, Varanasi, Chaikhamba Orientalia.

1918 births
2000 deaths
Indian classical choreographers
Indian dance teachers
Manipuri classical Indian dance exponents
Performers of Indian classical dance
Recipients of the Sangeet Natak Akademi Award
Indian film choreographers
Dancers from Manipur
Indian choreographers
20th-century Indian dancers
Educators from Manipur
Bishnupriya Manipuri people
Dancers from West Bengal